Melissa Ann Gorga (née Marco; born March 21, 1979) is an American television personality, author, singer, designer and businesswoman. She is a member of the cast of The Real Housewives of New Jersey, joining the show in its third season in 2011.

Early life

Gorga was born on March 21, 1979.  She is of Italian descent and grew up in Toms River, New Jersey. She attended New Jersey City University and lived in Bayonne, New Jersey, while in college.

Career
Gorga joined Bravo's reality television series The Real Housewives of New Jersey as a main cast member in 2011. In 2011, she appeared on the magazine cover of the August issue of Boardwalk Journal. She has also appeared in pictorials for Paper and Us Weekly.

She also has pursued a music career. Her single "On Display" was released on iTunes on August 13, 2011. Other singles were previewed on several season-four episodes, and Gorga issued a four-song EP. As of July 5, 2012, she has released two additional singles on iTunes: "How Many Times", released April 29, 2012, and "Rockstar", released June 10, 2012. Her fourth single, "I Just Wanna", was released September 2012. Written by and featuring hip hop singer Santino Noir, it was accompanied by a music video. In January 2016, Gorga told E! News she wouldn't be continuing her music career, but expressed interest to returning to music in the future.

Her book titled "Love, Italian Style: The Secret of My Hot and Happy Marriage" was published by St. Martin's Griffin in 2013. In 2014, Gorga introduced a jewelry line on HSN. In late 2015, she opened a clothing boutique called Envy by Melissa Gorga in Montclair, New Jersey, in premises built by her husband, Joe. In January 2017, the store was temporarily closed due to a dispute with her business partner, Jackie Beard Robinson; it re-opened later that month.  In December 2017, Robinson sued Gorga, alleging Gorga falsely accused Robinson of stealing merchandise from Envy.

In May 2017, the Gorgas opened a restaurant in East Hanover, New Jersey with Teresa Giudice named Gorga's Homemade Pasta and Pizza. In January 2018, the restaurant closed in search of larger space and new management.

Gorga starred in The Real Housewives Ultimate Girls Trip a spin-off featuring various women from The Real Housewives franchise, that premiered on Peacock in November 2021.

In December of 2021, Gorga launched her own interview and lifestyle podcast with PodcastOne titled "On Display" named after her first single.

Personal life 
She is married to Giuseppe "Joe" Gorga, who also appears on The Real Housewives of New Jersey, who is the brother of cast member Teresa Giudice. The Gorgas have 3 children: Antonia, Gino, and Joey and reside in Montville, New Jersey.

Filmography

Discography

Published works 

 Love Italian Style: The Secrets of My Hot and Happy Marriage, St. Martin's Press, 2013.

References

External links
 
 

1979 births
Living people
21st-century American women singers
American women pop singers
American women writers
American writers of Italian descent
New Jersey City University alumni
The Real Housewives cast members
People from Toms River, New Jersey
Place of birth missing (living people)
21st-century American singers